The Oaks Mall is an enclosed shopping center in Gainesville, Florida.

Its anchors include Belk, two Dillard's stores, J. C. Penney, and the University of Florida Health.

The mall interior is one floor, but Belk and both Dillard's stores have two floors.

The mall serves an extremely large trade area stretching into 11 counties with a population growth rate nearly double the national average. The center also benefits from its close proximity to over 64,000 students attending the nearby University of Florida and Santa Fe College. In 2017, mall occupancy was at 96%. Improvements continue to be made, including the installation of roof-top solar panels, and LED lighting fixtures.

History
The mall was announced in 1974 with JCPenney and Belk-Lindsey (both are still there today) being the first major tenants to lease space.  The Oaks Mall was the second major indoor mall in Gainesville after the Gainesville Mall, which was located at US 441 and NW 23rd Avenue and operated from 1969 to 1993.

The Oaks Mall opened in February 1978. Burdines, Sears, and Ivey's all opened in 1983 as part of the second and third stages.  Sears relocated from the Gainesville Mall.

In 2015, Sears Holdings spun off 235 of its properties, including the Sears at The Oaks Mall, into Seritage Growth Properties.

On January 4, 2018, Macy's announced it would be closing its location at the mall as part of a plan to close 11 stores nationwide. A liquidation sale began on January 8 and lasted until March 2018. Dillard's announced plans to expand into the former Macy's space while retaining its existing anchor location (former Ivey's) at the mall in order to offer a wider range of merchandise and opened in November 2018.

On April 20, 2018, it was announced that Sears will close its store as part of a plan to close 42 stores nationwide. The store closed in July 2018.

In June 2018, UF Health announced plans for a 20 year lease and renovation of the space to contain its ophthalmology and otolaryngology departments. The clinics had their grand opening on January 25, 2020.

External links
The Oaks Mall Official site
Google Maps

References

1978 establishments in Florida
Brookfield Properties
Buildings and structures in Alachua County, Florida
Buildings and structures in Gainesville, Florida
Shopping malls established in 1978
Shopping malls in Florida
Tourist attractions in Gainesville, Florida